Sphenomorphus brunneus  is a species of skink found in Papua New Guinea.

References

brunneus
Reptiles described in 1974
Taxa named by Allen Eddy Greer
Taxa named by Frederick Stanley Parker
Skinks of New Guinea